Jacob Druyvesteyn (1612 – 1691) was a Dutch lawyer and mayor of Haarlem.

Biography
He was born in Haarlem as the son of Aart Jansz Druyvesteyn and became a lawyer. He was appointed magistrate in the city council from 1637 and in 1639 he was portrayed as a flag bearer in Frans Hals' schutterstuk The Officers of the St George Militia Company in 1639. Traditionally flag bearers were bachelors, but he was not a bachelor for long, because he married Wilhelmina Coymans, the wealthy daughter of Joseph Coymans in the same year. In 1647 he became mayor like his father before him. Among other offices, he served as head bailiff of Kennemerland and board member of the Dutch East India Company and in 1657 he was colonel of the schutterij. 

He had nine children; his son Aarnoudt also became mayor. He died in Haarlem.

References

Collections of Paintings in Haarlem: 1572-1745, by Pieter Biesboer (editor Carol Togneri), Getty Trust Publications, Los Angeles, 2002

1612 births
1691 deaths
Mayors of Haarlem
People from Haarlem
Frans Hals
Frans Hals Museum